Robert William "Jack" Frost (29 December 1870 – 8 July 1935) was an Australian rules footballer who played with Carlton in the Victorian Football League (VFL).

Notes

External links 
		
 
Jack Frost's profile at Blueseum

1870 births
1935 deaths
Place of death missing
VFL/AFL players born in England
Carlton Football Club (VFA) players
Carlton Football Club players
English players of Australian rules football